In mathematics, piecewise syndeticity is a notion of largeness of subsets of the natural numbers.

A set  is called piecewise syndetic if there exists a finite subset G of  such that for every finite subset F of  there exists an  such that

where . Equivalently, S is piecewise syndetic if there is a constant b such that there are arbitrarily long intervals of  where the gaps in S are bounded by b.

Properties 
 A set is piecewise syndetic if and only if it is the intersection of a syndetic set and a thick set.
 If S is piecewise syndetic then S contains arbitrarily long arithmetic progressions.
(Brown, 1968)

Other notions of largeness
There are many alternative definitions of largeness that also usefully distinguish subsets of natural numbers:

 Cofiniteness
 IP set
 member of a nonprincipal ultrafilter
 positive upper density
 syndetic set
 thick set

See also 
Ergodic Ramsey theory

Notes

References 
 
 
 
 

Semigroup theory
Ergodic theory
Ramsey theory
Combinatorics